Clifftop is the name of several communities in the U.S. state of West Virginia.

Clifftop, Fayette County, West Virginia
Clifftop, Raleigh County, West Virginia

See also
Appalachian String Band Music Festival (often referred to simply as "Clifftop"), held each August in Clifftop, Fayette County, West Virginia
Cliff-top dune